This is a list of the National Register of Historic Places listings in Loving County, Texas.

This is intended to be a complete list of properties and districts listed on the National Register of Historic Places in Loving County, Texas. With a 2010 population of 82 residents, Loving County was once the least populous county in the United States.  Despite its small size, the county has one historic property listed on the National Register.

Current listings

The locations of National Register properties may be seen in a mapping service provided.

|}

See also
National Register of Historic Places listings in Texas
Recorded Texas Historic Landmarks in Loving County

References

External links

Loving County, Texas
Loving County
Buildings and structures in Loving County, Texas